Paul B. Dunbar (May 29, 1882 – August 22, 1968) was an American chemist who served as Commissioner of Food and Drugs from 1944 to 1951.

References

1882 births
1968 deaths
American food chemists
Commissioners of the Food and Drug Administration
Franklin D. Roosevelt administration personnel
Truman administration personnel